Thièvres is a commune in the Pas-de-Calais department in the Hauts-de-France region of France.

Geography
The village Thièvres is divided between two communes: one part in the Pas-de-Calais department and the other, smaller part in the Somme department (Thièvres, Somme).

Population

Places of interest
 The church of St. Pierre, dating from the nineteenth century.
 A nineteenth-century bridge over the river Authie.

See also
 Communes of the Pas-de-Calais department

References

Communes of Pas-de-Calais